Malali Ishaqzai was elected to represent Kandahar Province in Afghanistan's Wolesi Jirga, the lower house of its National Legislature, in 2005.
A report on Kandahar prepared at the Navy Postgraduate School stated she was a high school graduate. She serves on the Legislature's Government Services Committee.

References

Politicians of Kandahar Province
Members of the House of the People (Afghanistan)
21st-century Afghan women politicians
21st-century Afghan politicians
Living people
Year of birth missing (living people)